Double stack may refer to:

 Double-stack rail transport — trains with two layers of containers.
 A guitar amplifier configuration
 Dual IP stack implementation, in Internet Protocol version 6
 A well car